Sree Maheswara Temple is a Hindu temple situated at Koorkenchery in Thrissur city of Kerala state. The main idol in this temple is Lord Shiva which was consecrated by Narayana Guru himself in the Malayalam month of Chingam in the year 1092. There are sub-shrines for Parvathi, Ganapathi, Murugan  Ayyappan, Navagrahas and serpent deities here. Even though Lord Shiva is the main deity of the temple, Thaipooya Mahotsavam, a seven-day festival dedicated to Lord Subramanya, is the main festival held in this temple.

References

Hindu temples in Thrissur
Hindu temples in Thrissur district